Tau Gamma Phi, also known as Triskelions’ Grand Fraternity, is a fraternity established in the Philippines. Its members call themselves Triskelions. 

Tau Gamma Phi is one of the largest fraternities in the Philippines in terms of membership. It has a sister sorority, Tau Gamma Sigma, also known as the Triskelions' Grand Sorority.

History
The fraternity was founded on October 4, 1968 by students from the University of the Philippines Diliman. Originally known as the Order of the U.P. Triskelions, the organization later adopted the Greek-letter name Tau Gamma Phi. 

In 1969, the fraternity established a chapter at the Philippine Maritime Institute. This was followed in 1970, with chapters at FEATI University, Mapúa Institute of Technology, and National University, in 1971 with a chapter at University of Santo Tomas, and in 1973 with chapters at Adamson University and the National College of Business Administration.

When martial law was declared on September 21, 1972, by the late Philippine President Ferdinand Marcos, some university organizations including Tau Gamma Phi became targets of military harassment, believing that these school organizations posed a threat to the Marcos regime.

With martial law hindering most of its activities, the fraternity faced a decline in recruitment. In 1975, the fraternity explored the idea of including younger members. Recruitment began in the high school sector with the Junior Tau Gamma Phi (also known as the Junior Triskelions) founded at San Beda College–High School on February 7, 1974.

The fraternity celebrated its 45th founding anniversary in 2013, with President Benigno Aquino III offering an official message of congratulations to the organization.

Controversies

Hazing 
Although the fraternity has released a public statement declaring the organization has a "no hazing" policy, several hazing deaths directly linked to the fraternity have been reported since 2006.

In a 2012 interview, Tau Gamma Phi founder Vedasto “Tito” Venida condemned the fraternity's practice of hazing, adding that the organization has already "taken so many innocent lives." In 2015, after the hazing death of a Western Mindanao State University student, the fraternity released a statement calling on all chapters to abide by their fraternity motto Primum Nil Nocere or "First, Do No Harm" and commit to avoid violence related to hazing. Still, three further hazing deaths have been reported since then.

List of confirmed hazing deaths 
According to the ABS-CBN Investigative and Research Group, Tau Gamma Phi has the highest number of recorded hazing deaths among all Filipino fraternities, with 15 deaths as of March 2, 2023.

Rivalry with Alpha Phi Omega 
Tau Gamma Phi has been involved in several fatal clashes with long-standing rival fraternity Alpha Phi Omega:

 On August 30, 1977. 1977, UP Diliman student and APO member Rolando Abad was killed in a clash with rival members of Tau Gamma Phi.
 On February 21, 1994, Central Colleges of the Philippines student Fernando Obrino, a member of Tau Gamma Phi, died at St. Luke's Medical Center after being mauled by four members of APO (also students of CCP) in Cubao, Quezon City.
 On October 24, 2004, police found the body of 33-year-old Ronaldo de Guzman on a bench outside National University in Manila. De Guzman was an elder of Scouts Royale Brotherhood, which police identified as the youth arm of Alpha Phi Omega. Witnesses reported four gunmen, who identified as members of Tau Gamma Phi, threatening the younger members before shooting the elder three times in the face.
 On March 20, 2008, a grenade targeting members of Tau Gamma Phi exploded in front of La Consolacion College Manila, leaving 22 people injured. Police blamed fraternity rivalry as the motive behind the explosion, but initially refused to identify the perpetrators' organization. On November 9, 2010 then-justice secretary Leila de Lima tagged APO as the culprit in the grenade attack.
 On December 18, 2009, San Sebastian College student and APO member Cromwell Duka, Jr. was fatally stabbed in the school cafeteria by fellow student Efrain Lim, a member of Tau Gamma Phi.

Police investigators also believe that Tau Gamma Phi members were the intended targets of the grenade that exploded in the 2010 Philippine Bar exam bombing, that injured 47 people. One member of Alpha Phi Omega was indicted for the crime.

Notable members 
 Alvin Aguilar – martial artist and founder of DEFTAC Philippines
 Raymond Almazan – professional basketball player for the Meralco Bolts
 Bong Alvarez – retired professional basketball player
 Jobert Austria – actor and comedian
 Nathan Azarcon – musician and founding member of Rivermaya and Bamboo
 John Riel Casimero – professional boxer
 JM de Guzman – actor, model, and singer 
 JC Intal – former professional basketball player
 Pancho Magno – television actor
 Jiro Manio – film and television actor
 Luis Manzano – host, actor, comedian, VJ, and model
 Jao Mapa – film and television actor and painter
 Eumir Marcial – Olympic-medal winning boxer
 Joseph Marco – actor, model and singer
Lito Mayo – graphic artist and printmaker
 Buwi Meneses – bassist for Parokya ni Edgar and formerly for Franco
 Vhong Navarro – comedian, actor, dancer, recording artist, and television host
 Victor Neri – actor, singer, and chef
 Diether Ocampo – actor, singer, model, and military officer
 RJ Padilla – film and television actor
 Ion Perez – actor, model, and television host
 Vandolph Quizon – actor, comedian and councilor of the 1st district of Parañaque
 Ralph G. Recto – former senator and current representative of the 6th district of Batangas
 Oyo Boy Sotto – film and television actor
 Jose "Bong" Teves Jr. – Deputy Majority Leader of the House of Representatives
 TJ Trinidad – film and television actor
 Joel Villanueva – incumbent senator

See also 
Tau Gamma Sigma
List of fraternities and sororities in the Philippines
List of Tau Gamma Phi chapters

References 

Student societies in the Philippines
Fraternities and sororities in the Philippines
Student organizations established in 1968
1968 establishments in the Philippines